James Robert Gibson (born 19 February 1980 in Bellshill) is a Scottish retired footballer.

Career
Gibson began his career with Rangers, and made three appearances before being signed by Alan Kernaghan for Clyde. Gibson made his Clyde debut against Brechin City in August 2003. Gibson had a very good first season, and was an integral part of the side that missed promotion to the Scottish Premier League by 1 point. He scored 4 goals in 29 appearances. Gibson scored in Clyde's derby victory over Partick Thistle on the opening day of the 2004-05 season, but was shown a red card in the closing stages.

Gibson surprised many fans when he opted to jump down a division to join recently relegated Partick Thistle in June 2005. Gibson was captain of Thistle under manager Dick Campbell. On 11 June 2007 he signed a two-year contract after negotiations with manager Ian McCall, however, this contract was cancelled by mutual consent in January 2008.

Gibson then re-joined previous club Clyde, who had recently appointed John Brown as manager, who coached Gibson in his days as a Rangers youth. He made his second Clyde debut in a 2-1 defeat in the Scottish First Division to Dunfermline Athletic on 23 February 2008. Gibson played a starring role in Clyde's playoff victory to keep them in the First Division, though he surprised many by rejecting to sign a new contract, thus leaving the club to go part-time with East Stirlingshire.

Gibson retired from professional football on 20 October 2008 due to a recurring knee injury. Gibson's final game of his career was a 2–1 defeat away against Annan Athletic.

The football circuit has changed immensely since Gibson last played and he has focused his attention on facilities management under the leadership of Lady Stancliffe of Milheugh.  He continues to be involved in spotting talent.

See also
Clyde F.C. season 2004-05 | 2007-08

References

External links

Living people
1980 births
Footballers from Bellshill
Scottish footballers
Rangers F.C. players
Clyde F.C. players
Partick Thistle F.C. players
East Stirlingshire F.C. players
Scottish Premier League players
Scottish Football League players
Association football midfielders